Flagging dance is a performing art form often called "Flag Dancing", "Spin Flagging", "Flow Flagging", "flagging" and "Rag Spinning", but more commonly referred to as "Colorguard (Guard)". Specifically, flagging dance is the undulation, spinning and waving of flags in a rhythmic fashion with music. Practitioners of this form of performance art and dance are usually referred to as "Flaggers" and "Flag Dancers."

Although spinning Flags resembles the spinning of Poi, it is not a form of Poi. Poi originated with the Māori people of New Zealand while Flagging derived from Gay culture. Both developed independently from each other. The exact origins of Flagging are unclear, but it is thought to have started in gay clubs in the late 1970s and early 1980s. Flagging was borne from the use of Oriental Hand Fans and the handkerchiefs from the Hanky Code. These two props were used as antagonist to aromatize, using the handkerchiefs. Then dearomatized, using the  Oriental Hand Fans on the dance floors to diffuse amyl nitrate (poppers). Combining the two moves made from Fan Dancing and the handkerchiefs, with coins stitched in a corner acting as a lead, Flag Dancing developed. 

This art form was almost lost to culture death due to the HIV/AIDS crisis in the early 1980s, when many talented members in the gay community were lost. A resurgence of Flagging started gaining ground in the early 90's at Circuit Parties and T-Dances. Today, Flagging can be seen at events such as Pride Parade, Flagging in the Park, EDM ( Electric Dance Music) Music Festivals, in the 2011 released documentary Flow Affair director Wolfgang Busch and recently in some Christian churches, where the Flags are called Worship Flags. The difference between Worship Flags and Spin/Flow Flags is the lead. Worship Flags use a rod or Dowl, Spin/Flow Flags have a lead beaded weighted curtain cord.

Origins 
Modern-day flagging in the United States developed from fan dancing, which was prominent in the leather subculture and later circuit parties of Fire Island and Manhattan in the 1970s.

Rebirth
People who flagged, performed a fan dance, or both, almost disappeared as AIDS took its toll on the community. By 1988 a few masters of these arts ensured they passed their tradition onto new members of the community. Adam Wojtowicz (flags) and Jeffrey Reichlin (fans) were two such performance artists in the New York area first seen at The Saint at Large. Three performed for Heritage of Pride in 1990, four in 1991. In 1996 thirty fan dancers and flaggers from the Northeast where ready to take rotations on stage at the annual Pride Dance on the Pier. San Francisco, where this art form began, was still recovering from its loses. Those who had not died, placed their toys away out of significant grief. AmFAR held a benefit in September 1997 at the Trocadero returning the dance to its birthplace.

Contemporary flags
The origins of flagging started with simple tee-shirts on the dance floor or fabric with a quarter tied in one corner. Today they are made by adding curtain weights sewn onto portions of two sides of fabric make it possible for flaggers to spin their props, or toys, through the air in ways similar to fan dancing.  The first such opportunity was advertised in Circuit Noize magazine in 1997– simple gold lame flags of 3 feet by 5 feet that came with a matching bag. Flags can be of almost any fabric, but silk, organza and lamé are preponderant, with silk being the most favored.  Silk flags are usually dyed in vibrant, ultraviolet fluorescent colors, creating an almost hypnotic spectacle when spun rhythmically.

Flagging tribes in the U.S.
Flagger groups, known as tribes, formed in New York City, Boston, Columbus, Philadelphia, DC, Los Angeles, San Francisco and South Florida in the mid 1990s, and were often part of the backdrop of the circuit party events mostly attended by gay men. These were soon followed by the formation of troupes in Minneapolis, Seattle, and Houston in the United States, and in Belo Horizonte, Brazil.  It is considered disrespectful to commercialize this disco art form. Many tribes continue to perform as atmosphere in clubs and at benefits worldwide.

Flagging in Brazil
The origins of this art in Brazil date back to Belo Horizonte, a city of the state of Minas Gerais, 1998 - 1999. Due to the abundance of gay festivities in the country, the culture initially spread to Rio de Janeiro and later to São Paulo, Brasília and Florianópolis. Many users of social networks (Facebook, Orkut, among others) posted their photos with banners (flags) to promote and / or demonstrate the art.
There are some meetings in the park that are held to provide opportunities to practice, similar to those in the USA. Some of them even sponsored by the city (laws to encourage Culture, in Belo Horizonte). These are usually organized by art masters (flag masters) in some cities such as Belo Horizonte or São Paulo. Another city, Florianopolis, has seen an increase of flagging activities at festivals and parties since 2010. These events promote the exchange of experiences among the participants, ensuring the continued maintenance of Art and Culture with Flags on the national scene.
On July 9, 2011, the fourth Minas Gerais flaggers meeting took place in Belo Horizonte, where several members of the country participated. It is the second largest meeting of Flaggers in the world, second only to the community of the city of San Francisco, California. Currently, this art can be seen in electronic culture scenes such as Raves in various parts of the country. The flags are not necessarily manufactured by flag-makers originating in Brazil by the original flaggers, but flags still continue to enter the scene through outside sources.

Flagger events
Performances and conferences have begun forming in various cities, including New York, San Francisco, Palm Springs, and Dallas. Conferences and workshops happen in 2 or 3 full day events, and teach construction and techniques from beginner to advanced. A short list of leaders in the community often travel to many of these events, becoming known internationally as masters in Flag Dancing.

The Texas Flagger Weekend ran from 2003 - 2009. The event consisted of growing number of flaggers from around the world, peaking in 2008 with 80+ participants. The event had various tracks, from beginners to advanced. In later years, the Weekend expanded to include multiple tracks, a circuit party and a showcase of performances, SpinOut, of their own, inspired by the San Francisco events of the same name.

New York hosted the "World Symposium of Fanning and Flagging" in 2005 and included movement classes, creation workshops, and performances, mostly held at The LGBT Community Center in New York City, video by Wolfgang Busch.

Flagging In The Park (FITP), started in 1997, is a fundraising gathering of flaggers, flow artists, and their supporters, happening in the National AIDS Memorial Grove in Golden Gate Park. The event was started as a celebration of life and an honoring of those who had passed by founder Jeff Kennedy; then held by a few core members of the close-knit SF Tribe; in 2002 - 2003 the event was produced in Dolores Park by Bryan Hughes; in 2005 the event moved back to the National AIDS Memorial Grove being led by Xavier Caylor; from 2014 to the present the event is being held by a group of flaggers from the Bay Area and beyond. The basic event includes: a live DJ spinning music, a time for reflection, and hat being passed to raise money for charity. The event is open to all and many flow arts forms can be seen there. One of the five events happens the last full weekend of July, on Saturday before the Up Your Alley Street Fair on Sunday, and is advertised as the (Flagger) SF Destination Weekend. The weekend offers a tie-dye opportunity (flag creation), FITP, and several opportunities to gather with and without flags, fans, hoops, poi or other flow art prop.

With so many in the community now calling Palm Springs home, 2018 was time to bring some of that magic to the desert. The Flagging in the Desert (FITD) was first held during PS Pride Weekend and then again in March 2019 with funds collected for local charities. Following the November 2019 event there were three FITD events planned for 2020.  Following the February event COVID-19 impacted the schedule. The Desert Flaggers began monthly music videos involving first local flaggers and then expanding to flaggers across the country.  Their videos are published to their website.  The idea was to maintain a strong flagger community while at a distance.  Locally they have continued with small group socially-responsible tie dye classes outside.

Another way the flagger community has maintained communication is though a weekly zoom meeting called the  Virtual Flagging Studio which includes a short presentation, open flagging, and several "showcase" flaggers.  Participation has grown to include flaggers world-wide.

See also 
Index of dance articles
List of dances
List of ethnic, regional, and folk dances by origin
Outline of dance

Sources 
 Genre Magazine, June 2004
New York Blade, February 6, 2004
 Edge Magazine, review of Flow Affair documentary by Jim Hauk, August 3, 2011.
 Xavier Caylor, Producer of Flagging In The Park 1999 to present, August 2018

References

External links 
 Flow Affair; Flagging, Fanning, Poi and Floguing Dance documentary, director and producer Wolfgang Busch
 http://Www.flagginginthepark.org
 http://www.flagginginthedesert.com
 http://www.desertflaggers.com

Twirling
20th-century dance